Asigarh Fort, also called Hansi Fort, is located on the eastern bank of Amti lake in Hansi city of Haryana, India, about 135 km from Delhi on NH9. Spread over 30 acres, in its prime days this fort used to be in control of 80 forts in the area around it. The fort is said to be one of the most impregnable forts of ancient India and has been declared a centrally protected monument by ASI in 1937.

Etymology
Asigarh the fort of swords, from Asi (sword) and garh (fort), as this was the centre of sword making from the ancient times of Hindu rulers.

There are several names used for the fort in different anecdotes, such as Asidurga, Asigarh, Asika, A-sika, Ansi, Hansi, etc.,

History

Earlier Fort
Hansi fort or Asigarh Fort has long history with little clarity about the earlier period. The excavation of ancient coins belong to the BCE period shows that there have been long history of settlements on the mound on which fort is built.

Tomars - Builder and first rulers of present Asigarh Fort

As per British library, Hansi city is believed to have been founded by Anangpal Tomar (Anangpal II), the Tomar king of Delhi. The son of King Anangpal Tomar, Drupad established a sword manufacturing factory in this fort, hence it is also called "Asigarh". Swords from this fort were exported as far away as to Arab countries. As per Talif-e-Tajkara-e-Hansi by Qazi Sharif Husain in 1915, around 80 forts across the area were controlled from this centre "Asigarh".

The Tomar Empire during the reign of Anangpal II extended over various parts of Delhi, Haryana, Punjab, Himachal Pradesh, Uttar Pradesh, Madhya Pradesh and Rajasthan. In addition to the Asigarh (Hansi), other important places of this dynasty were Sthaneshwar (Thanesar), Sonkh (Mathura), Taragarh, Gopachal(Gwalior), Tanwarhinda (Bhatinda), Tanwarghaar, Pathankot - Nurpur, Patan - Tanwarawati, Nagarkot (Kangra),

Multiple (three) Tomara Gurjar kings seem to have shared the name "Anangapala" (IAST: Anaṅgapāla). Around 1000 CE, Asigarh, Haryana and Delhi were in control of emperors of Tomara dynasty, when in 1014 Mahmud Ghazni attacked Thanesar and Hansi where he mass destroyed Hindu temples, and again in 1025 he also attacked Somnath templeof Jud. Mahmud Ghazni had sent his son Mas'ud I of Ghazni to attack Hansi in 1037 CE, when Masud attacked swordsmen of Hansi and took Hindu women into slavery who were later sold at Gazni. In 1041 in revenge for murder of his father, Mahmud Ghazni's nephew Mawdud of Ghazni (r. 1041-50 CE) seized the throne from his uncle Mahmud Ghazni. Kumarpal Tomar (or Mahipal Tomar) of Tomar dynasty who ruled this area from Delhi in the 11th century recaptured Hansi and Thanesar regions from Mawdud, and based on fragmentary Tomar inscriptions discovered from Mahipalpur in Delhi it has been theorized that Mahipala established a new capital at Mahipalapura (now Mahipalpur).

Chauhan rule
According to the Bijolia inscription of Someshvara of Chauhan dynasty, his brother Vigraharaja IV had captured Dhillika (Delhi) and Ashika (Hansi). He probably defeated the Tomar king Anangapala III. Additions were made to the fort by Prithviraj Chauhan in the 12th century.

Muslim rule
In 1192, after the defeat of Prithviraj Chauhan by Mohammed Gauri, Hindu rule ended in Hansi.

Sikh and Maratha rule 
In 1705, during the time of Aurangzeb, Guru Gobind Singh toured Hansi to inspired the people to revolt against the oppressive Mughal rule. In 1707, Baba Banda Singh Bahadur attacked Hansi. In 1736, the fort was under Maratha rule. In 1780s Maharaja Jassa Singh Ramgarhia also took this area under his control for some years as a Maratha vassal and then left.

British colonial rule
From 1798 to 1801, George Thomas, an Irish immigrant who rose from an ordinary sailor, usurped the area around Hansi and made Asigarh fort his capital.

In 1803 after the Anglo-Maratha Wars, the British East India Company rule seized the fort, but did not take control until 1810 and after which they controlled it till independence of India in 1947.

The fort was again built by George Thomas in 1798 when he carved out his own kingdom consisting of Hisar and Rohtak districts with capital at Hansi.

In 1803 Hansi was also the headquarters of Colonel James Skinner CB (1778 – 4 December 1841) the Anglo-Indian military adventurer in India, who founded 1st Skinner's Horse and 3rd Skinner's Horse at Hansi in 1803. These units are still part of the Indian Army. in 1818 was granted a jagir  of Hansi (Hisar district, Haryana), yielding Rs 20,000 a year.

Hansi took an active part in the Sepoy Mutiny (Gadar), Lala  Hukam Chand Jain was martyred in 1857 by Britishers. 

British Indian Army built a cantonment in this fort after George Thomas surrendered to British Raj in 1803.  During the revolt of 1857, the cantonment was abandoned and the fort was damaged. The prisoners of the Kuka movement were imprisoned in this fort during the 1880s.

Fort Details 
At the south end of the fort is a big gate added later by George Thomas. The carvings on the walls assign it to be of Hindu origin.

Main gate
The main gate has the beautiful carvings of birds, animals and Hindu deities.

Baradari
Long pillared structure with a flat roof is situated on the top of the mound and is known as Baradari.

Char Qutub Dargah

A mosque is also located inside the fort complex which was added after the defeat of Prithviraj Chauhan.

Excavations
The ancient coins of the period before Christ were found here. 57 bronze images of Jain thirthankars were found during excavation in the fort. A statue of the Buddha was excavated here.
In February 1982, a large hoard - known as Hansi hoard - of Jaina bronzes including idols belonging to the Gupta period (319 to 605 CE) and 7th–8th centuries (a period belonging to the emperor Harshavardhana's Pushyabhuti dynasty, c. 500 to 647 CE) were discovered.

See also 

 List of Monuments of National Importance in Haryana
 List of State Protected Monuments in Haryana
 Hansi hoard

References

External links
 Field study and documentation  by American Institute of Indian Studies in Jan-Feb 2010.
 Video: Asigarh Fort, 7.40m.
 51-image  online picture gallery of Asigarh fort taken by American Institute of Indian Studies in 2008 CE
 Online picture gallery of Indo-Islamic monuments of Haryana taken by American Institute of Indian Studies in 2008 CE
Images of Asigarh Fort on ASI website

Forts in Haryana
Hisar (city)
Archaeological sites in Hisar district
Tourist attractions in Hisar (city)
Archaeological sites in Haryana
Tourist attractions in Haryana
Rebuilt buildings and structures in India
History of Hisar district
Tourist attractions in Hisar district
Cantonments of British India